The Captain Cook Bridge is a road bridge that carries the Pacific Motorway across the Brisbane River in Brisbane, in the state of Queensland, Australia. It was built exclusively for vehicular traffic and was completed in late 1972. The bridge had its naming ceremony on 13 December 1972, with it opening in January/February 1973. A once only pedestrian walk event across the bridge happened shortly before it was opened to vehicular traffic on 21 January 1973, organised by the Rotary Club of Stones Corner. The bridge crosses at the South Brisbane Reach of the river, linking Gardens Point in the Brisbane central business district on the north side to Kangaroo Point and South Brisbane on the southside.

Location and features

Captain Cook Bridge is constructed as a multispan, precast prestressed concrete free-cantilever bridge with drop-in mid-spans. Comprising a dual carriageway that creates two separate bridges, one for each direction of traffic, heading north–south over the Brisbane River. Each bridge carries four lanes of traffic in one direction and links the M3 Pacific Motorway to the M3 Riverside Expressway. It is the main route from the city's south into the Brisbane central business district.

The structure is Queensland's busiest traffic bridge with more than one million vehicles crossing it weekly in 2007.

Downstream from the Captain Cook Bridge is the Story Bridge, while the Goodwill Bridge is the next crossing upstream.

Concerns were raised in 2007 about the structure's integrity after it was revealed that contractors who attached a gantry to the bridge had drilled numerous holes which had damaged steel reinforcement bars. After investigations were completed it was concluded that the damage was insignificant as only 57 vertical steel bars out of  had been cut.

Upgrades
A maintenance project, started in late 2019, and estimated to cost $26 million, was still ongoing in July 2022.

See also

 Bridges over the Brisbane River
 Road transport in Brisbane

References

External links

 

Bridges completed in 1972
Bridges over the Brisbane River
Concrete bridges in Australia
Road bridges in Queensland
Box girder bridges
Kangaroo Point, Queensland
Brisbane central business district
South Brisbane, Queensland
1972 establishments in Australia